Balacra flavimacula is a moth of the family Erebidae. It was described by Francis Walker in 1856. It is found in Angola, Cameroon, the Republic of the Congo, the Democratic Republic of the Congo, Equatorial Guinea, Gabon, Ghana, Guinea, Ivory Coast, Kenya, Nigeria, Tanzania and Uganda.

References

Balacra
Moths described in 1856
Erebid moths of Africa